The second season of the American horror anthology television series American Horror Story, subtitled Asylum, takes place in 1964 and follows the stories of the staff and inmates who occupy the fictional mental institution Briarcliff Manor, and intercuts with events in the past and present. The ensemble cast includes Zachary Quinto, Joseph Fiennes, Sarah Paulson, Evan Peters, Lily Rabe, Lizzie Brocheré, James Cromwell, and Jessica Lange, with all returning from the first season, except Fiennes, Brocheré, and Cromwell.

Created by Ryan Murphy and Brad Falchuk for cable network FX, the series is produced by 20th Century Fox Television. Asylum was broadcast between October 17, 2012, to January 23, 2013, consisting of 13 episodes and attracting moderate ratings success for the network. Like its predecessor, the second season was well received by television critics, particularly for the performances of Lange, Cromwell, Quinto, Paulson, Peters and Rabe. As a result, the season garnered seventeen Primetime Emmy Award nominations, more than any other show, including Outstanding Miniseries or Movie, and four acting nominations for Lange, Paulson, Cromwell, and Quinto, with Cromwell winning for Outstanding Supporting Actor in a Miniseries or a Movie. In addition, Quinto and Paulson won their respective supporting categories at the 3rd Critics' Choice Television Awards.

Despite being formally anthological, some of the cast members reprise their roles in the fourth and the sixth seasons, Freak Show and Roanoke, such as Rabe, Naomi Grossman, Paulson, and James Cromwell, portraying Sister Mary Eunice McKee, Pepper, Lana Winters, and a young version of Dr. Arthur Arden, also known as Hans Grüper, respectively.

Cast and characters

Main

 Zachary Quinto as Dr. Oliver Thredson 
 Joseph Fiennes as Monsignor Timothy Howard 
 Sarah Paulson as Lana Winters
 Evan Peters as Kit Walker
 Lily Rabe as Sister Mary Eunice McKee 
 Lizzie Brocheré as Grace Bertrand
 James Cromwell as Dr. Arthur Arden
 Jessica Lange as Sister Jude Martin

Recurring
 Naomi Grossman as Pepper
 Fredric Lehne as Frank McCann
 Britne Oldford as Alma Walker
 Chloë Sevigny as Shelley
 Frances Conroy as Shachath
 Jenna Dewan as Teresa Morrison
 Clea DuVall as Wendy Peyser
 Mark Engelhardt as Carl
 Dylan McDermott as Johnny Morgan
 Barbara Tarbuck as Mother Superior Claudia 
 Mark Consuelos as Spivey 
 Matthew John Armstrong as Detective Byers 
 Adam Levine as Leo Morrison
 Mark Margolis as Sam Goodman
 Joel McKinnon Miller as Detective Connors

Guest stars
 Joe Egender as Billy Marshall
 Ian McShane as Leigh Emerson
 Vanessa Mizzone as Lois
 Franka Potente as Anne Frank / Charlotte Brown

Episodes

Production

Development

In October 2011, the FX Network renewed American Horror Story for a second season. In December 2011, series co-creator Ryan Murphy announced his plans to change the characters and location for the second season. He did say, however, that some actors who starred in the first season would be returning. "The people that are coming back will be playing completely different characters, creatures, monsters, etc. [The Harmons'] stories are done. People who are coming back will be playing entirely new characters," he announced.

In May 2012, Murphy revealed that the setting for the second season would be an institution for the criminally insane that Jessica Lange's character operates in the 1960s, called Briarcliff Manor and located on the East Coast. In an interview with Entertainment Weekly, Murphy spoke about originally wanting to set the season in prison, "I think at one point as we were spitballing season two before we landed on the asylum idea, we had actually talked about doing the second season in a prison but then Alcatraz came along and stole that idea. It was never very definitive, but I always liked that idea. I think an insane asylum for us was probably much more effective."

Talking about the season, Murphy commented, "It's a completely different world and has nothing to do with season 1; there's not a mention of season 1... The second season is set in a completely different time period." He later said, "Everyone looks so different; people who were enemies last year are allies this year. The sets are amazing. It's 1964, so everything looks very different."

Murphy had also told TV Guide that there would not be any ghosts in the second season, "I think the story is horrifying," he said. "The story is a period piece in a mental institution based largely on truth, and truth is always scarier than fiction."

In August 2012, Murphy announced the season's new name by stating, "We picked 'Asylum' because it not only describes the setting – an insane asylum run by Jessica Lange's character which was formerly a tuberculosis ward – but also signifies a place of haven for the unloved and the unwanted," he said. "This year's theme is about sanity and tackling real-life horrors."

Previous consulting producer Tim Minear was promoted to executive producer and continued writing for the series, beginning with the season premiere. He also scripted the season finale.

Casting
In March 2012, Murphy revealed that the second season had been conceptualized around Jessica Lange, saying, "This will really be the Jessica Lange show, so I'm very excited about it. We are designing this amazing new opposite of the Constance character for her. She and I have spoken about different things. She has a lot of ideas and has a lot of input into her character. She told me some things she has always wanted to play as an actress." She portrayed Sister Jude, an apparent sadistic nun. Zachary Quinto, who had a recurring role as Chad in the first season, was confirmed as one of the leads in March 2012. He portrayed Dr. Oliver Thredson, a psychiatrist with groundbreaking treatment methods that go against Sister Jude's. Comparing his new character to his previous one, Quinto said, "He's much more grounded and in control." At the PaleyFest 2012, Evan Peters, Sarah Paulson, and Lily Rabe were confirmed to return as main cast members for the second season. Paulson portrayed Lana Winters, a lesbian reporter whose girlfriend is coerced by Sister Jude into having her committed to the asylum, Rabe portrayed Sister Mary Eunice, an innocent and loyal second-in-charge to Sister Jude, and Peters portrayed Kit Walker, a man who's accused of murdering his wife, Alma (Britne Oldford), but he claims aliens abducted her. Murphy had stated that Peters, "who was last season's ultimate badass bad boy," would be the hero of the show this season.

It was reported in March 2012 that Maroon 5 frontman Adam Levine was in final negotiations to appear in the second season and that he would play Leo, a "contemporary character and half of a couple called "The Lovers," according to Tim Stack of Entertainment Weekly. Levine revealed to E! in June 2012 that his character is "newly married" and would go with his wife on their honeymoon. "I don't want to tell you too much... but it's gory." Jenna Dewan-Tatum played his wife, Teresa. In April 2012, Lizzie Brocheré was cast to play Grace, a character described originally as "a fierce, ferocious, extremely sexual, and dangerous wild-child sexpot" to rival Jessica Lange's character, but the role was later heavily revamped. In May 2012, James Cromwell signed on to co-star as Dr. Arthur Arden, a man who works in the asylum, and who is revealed to have been a Nazi. Chloë Sevigny played the role of Shelley, a nymphomaniac whose husband has her placed in the asylum.

In June 2012, Joseph Fiennes joined the main cast as Monsignor Timothy Howard, a possible love interest for Jessica Lange's Sister Jude. Later that month, Chris Zylka was cast to play Daniel, who was touted as "the most beautiful boy in the world and a deaf-mute"; however, Zylka was later replaced by an unmentioned actor, due to his reluctance to shave his head for the role. Britne Oldford was cast in the recurring role of Alma, Peters' character's supposed dead/missing wife. In July 2012, Mark Consuelos was cast as a patient named Spivey, who was described as a degenerate bully. Also in July, Clea DuVall was cast as Wendy, a school teacher and Lana's girlfriend, and Franka Potente was cast in an unspecified role, which was later revealed to be Anne Frank / Charlotte Brown.

In August 2012, Blake Sheldon was cast in the dual role of Devon and Cooper – both described as "tall, thin and psychopathic." Ultimately Sheldon would portray only Cooper. Murder House actress Frances Conroy guest-starred as Shachath, the Angel of Death. Eric Stonestreet was scheduled to guest star this season as a killer, but his appearance never came to fruition. Mark Margolis recurred as Sam Goodwin, while David Chisum and Amy Farrington guest-starred as a caring husband and a troubled mother, respectively. In mid-October, Ian McShane joined the season in the recurring role of Leigh Emerson, a psychotic man who murders people while wearing a Santa Claus suit; he has a vendetta against Sister Jude. Dylan McDermott appeared during the second half of the season as Johnny Morgan, the modern-day Bloody Face.

Filming
Principal photography for the second season began on July 17, 2012. The exteriors for the second season were filmed in Hidden Valley, Ventura County, California, a rural area outside Los Angeles. The exterior filming of Briarcliff was done at the Old Orange County Courthouse. Series production designer Mark Worthington stated, "It's referred to as Richardsonian and Romanesque. It's named after an architect named Henry Hobson Richardson. He developed the style in the 19th century. It's circular arches, heavy stone. It's creepy, great for horror. It's dark, dark shiny brick. That's how we got away from all the hospital light stuff. There's still an institutional feel to it."

Reception

Critical response
American Horror Story: Asylum has received positive reviews from critics. It scored 65 out of 100 on Metacritic based on 23 reviews. The review aggregation website Rotten Tomatoes reported an 84% approval rating with an average rating of 7.27/10 based on 44 reviews. The website's consensus reads, "American Horror Story: Asylum crosses boundaries to shock and scare with sexy subplots and some innovative takes on current social issues." James Poniewozik, from Time, said of the early episodes of the second season, "AHS: Asylum feels like a more focused, if equally frenetic, screamfest. It's also gorgeously realized, with a vision of its '60s institution setting so detailed you can smell the stale air and incense."

Maureen Ryan of The Huffington Post said, "It's to the credit of Asylum writers, directors and cast that the emotional pain of the characters often feels as real as their uncertainty and terror." However, Verne Gay of Newsday gave the season a C grade, writing that it "has some good special effects, just not much of a story to hang them on." Linda Stasi of the New York Post thought this season was "over the top", stating, "I need to enter [an asylum] myself after two hours of this craziness."

In a round-up of outstanding entertainers and programs of 2012, Jess Cagle of Entertainment Weekly praised "its ballsy, go-for-broke, don't-tax-the-attention-span-of-any-gnats-who-might-be-watching approach", writing, "You know a show has a lot going on when the occasional appearance of extraterrestrials is no more surprising than spotting a Prius on Modern Family. FX's grand experiment American Horror Story came howling back for its second terrifying season with less of a story...than a macabre, unforgettable, discordant symphony of images and characters... American Horror Story: Asylum, set mostly in the 1960s, took the current zeitgeist – with all its free-floating fear, nefarious undercurrents, and outrageous anxiety – skinned it alive, and turned it into a lamp to illuminate our collectively twisted psyche and voracious appetite for distraction."

Awards and nominations

In its second season, American Horror Story: Asylum was nominated for 89 awards and won 28.

* The Pan-American Association of Film & Television Journalists never announced the winners.

Ratings

The first episode of the season gained a 2.2 ratings share among adults aged 18–49 and garnered 3.85 million viewers, marking the highest numbers for the series and the highest numbers for the night's cable competition.

Home media

Soundtrack

Digital singles

References

External links

 
 

American Horror Story (season 2)
American Horror Story (season 2)
2010s American drama television series
2010s American LGBT-related drama television series
Abortion in fiction
Alien abduction in television
02
Angels in television
Cannibalism in fiction
Catholicism in fiction
Cultural depictions of Anne Frank
Demons in television
Fiction about the Devil
Fiction about interracial romance
Fiction set in 1964
Filicide in fiction
Human experimentation in fiction
Lesbian-related television shows
Television about mental health
Mythology in popular culture
Nazis in fiction
Nuns in fiction
Primetime Emmy Award-winning television series
Rape in television
Serial killers in television
Suicide in television
Television series set in the 1960s
Television series set in the 2010s
Television shows about exorcism
Television shows about spirit possession
Television shows set in Massachusetts
UFO-related television
Works about discrimination
Works about racism
Works set in psychiatric hospitals